Tuckasegee may refer to:

 Tuckasegee River, tributary of the Little Tennessee River in western North Carolina
 Tuckasegee, North Carolina, unincorporated community in Jackson County

See also
Tuckasegee darter, a species of darter fish
Tuskegee (disambiguation)